Staroye Chubarovo is a rural locality (a village) in Lavrovskoye Rural Settlement, Sudogodsky District, Vladimir Oblast, Russia. The population was 8 as of 2010.

Geography 
Staroye Chubarovo is located on the Yada River, 9 km east of Sudogda (the district's administrative centre) by road. Zagorye is the nearest rural locality.

References 

Rural localities in Sudogodsky District